Under UNESCO's Man and Biosphere Reserve Programme, there are 142 biosphere reserves recognized as part of the World Network of Biosphere Reserves in Asia and the Pacific as of April 2016. These are distributed across 24 countries in the region.

The list
Below is the list of biosphere reserves in Asia and the Pacific, organized by country/territory, along with the year these were designated as part of the World Network of Biosphere Reserves.

Australia
 Croajingolong, Victoria (1977)
 Riverland, South Australia (1977)
 Kosciuszko, New South Wales (1977)
 Prince Regent River, Western Australia (1977)
 Mamungari (formerly Unnamed), South Australia (1977)
 Uluru (Ayers Rock-Mount Olga), Northern Territory (1977)
 Yathong, New South Wales (1977)
 Fitzgerald River, Western Australia (1978)
 Hattah-Kulkyne and Murray-Kulkyne, Victoria (1981)
 Wilsons Promontory, Victoria (1981)
 Mornington Peninsula and Western Port, Victoria (2002)
 Barkindji, New South Wales and Victoria (2005)
 Noosa, Queensland (2007)
 Great Sandy, Queensland (2009)

Cambodia
 Tonlé Sap (1997)

China
 Lushan, Jiangxi (1979)
 Changbaishan (1979)
 Dinghushan, Guangdong (1979)
 Wolong, Sichuan (1979)
 Fanjingshan, Guizhou (1986)
 Xilin Gol, Inner Mongolia (1987)
 Wuyishan, Jiangxi and Fujian (1987)
 Bogeda, Xinjiang (1990)
 Shennongjia, Hubei (1990)
 Yancheng, Jiangsu (1992)
 Xishuangbanna, Yunnan (1993)
 Maolan, Guizhou (1996)
 Tianmushan, Zhejiang (1996)
 Fenglin (1997)
 Jiuzhaigou Valley, Sichuan (1997)
 , Zhejiang (1998)
 Shankou Mangrove, Guangxi (2000)
 Baishuijiang, Gansu (2000)
 Gaoligong Mountain, Yunnan (2000)
 Huanglong Scenic and Historic Interest Area, Sichuan (2000)
 Baotianman, Henan (2001)
 Saihan Wula, Inner Mongolia (2001)
 Dalai Lake, Inner Mongolia (2002)
 Wudalianchi, Heilongjiang (2003)
 Yading, Sichuan (2003)
 Foping, Shaanxi (2004)
 Qomolangma (Mount Everest), Tibet (2004)
 Chebaling, Guangdong (2007)
 Xingkai Lake, Heilongjiang (2007)
 Mao'er Mountain, Guangxi (2011)
 Jinggangshan, Jiangxi (2012)
 Niubeiliang (2012)
 Snake Island - Laotie Mountain (2013)
 Hanma (2015)

Federated States of Micronesia
 Utwe (2005)
 And Atoll (2007)

India
 Nilgiri (Karnataka, Kerala & Tamil Nadu) (1986)
 Gulf of Mannar (1989)
 Sunderbans (1989)
 Nanda Devi (1988)
 Nokrek (1988)
 Pachmarhi (1999)#MP
 Simlipal (1994)
 Achanakmar-Amarkantak (2005)
 Great Nicobar (1989)
 Agasthyamala (2005)
 Khangchendzonga (2018) ( Sikkim)
 Panna (2020)

Indonesia
 Cibodas, including Gunung Gede Pangrango National Park (1977)  
 Komodo (1977)
 Lore Lindu (1977)
 Tanjung Puting (1977)
 Mount Leuser National Park (1981)
 Siberut (1981) 
 Giam Siak Kecil-Bukit Batu (2009)
 Wakatobi (2012)
 Bromo Tengger Semeru, including Arjuno-Welirang (2015)
 Taka Bonerate-Kepulauan Selayar (2015)
 Belambangan (2016)
 Berbak - Sembilang (2018)
 Betung Kerihun-Danau Sentarum Kapuas Hulu (2018)
 Rinjani Lombok (2018)
 Saleh-Moyo-Tambora (Samota) (2019)
 Togean Tojo Una-Una (2019)

Iran
 Arasbaran (1976)
 Arjan and Parishan (1976)
 Geno (1976)
 Golestan (1976)
 Hara (1976)
 Kavir (1976)
 Lake Urmia (1976)
 Miankaleh (1976)
 Touran (1976)
 Dena (2010)
 Tang-e-Sayad & Sabzkuh(2015)
 Hamoun (2016)

Japan
 Mount Hakusan (1980)
 Mount Ōdaigahara & Mount Ōmine (1980)
 Shiga Highland (1980)
 Yakushima Island (1980)
 Aya (2012)
 Minami-Alps (2014)
 Sobo, Katamuki and Okue (2017)
 Minakami (2017)

Kazakhstan
 Korgalzhyn (2012)	 	 	 
 Alakol (2013)	 	 	 
 Akzhayik (2014)	 	 	 
 Katon-Karagay (2014)	 	 	 
 Aksu-Zhabagly (2015)	 	 	 
 Barsakelmes (2016)
 Altyn-Emel (2017)
 Karatau (2017)

Kyrgyzstan
 Sary-Chelek (1978)
 Issyk Kul (2001)

Malaysia
 Tasik Chini (2009)
 Crocker Range (2014)

Maldives
 Baa Atoll 2011

Mongolia
 Great Gobi (1990)
 Bogd Khan Mountain (1996)
 Ubsunur Hollow Biosphere Reserve (1997)
 Khustain Nuruu National Park (2002)
 Dornod Mongol (2005)
 Mongol Daguur (2007)

Myanmar
 Inlay Lake (2015)
 Indawgyi Lake (2017)

North Korea
 Mount Paekdu (1989)
 Mount Kuwol (2004)
 Mount Myohyang (2009)
 Mount Chilbo (2014)

Pakistan
 Lal Suhanra National Park (1977)
 Ziarat Juniper Forest (2013)

Palau
 Ngaremeduu (2005)

Philippines
 Puerto Galera (1977)
 Palawan (1990)
 Albay (March 2016)

South Korea
 Mount Sorak (1982)
 Jeju Island (2002)
 Shinan Dadohae (Sinan Dadohae Biosphere Reserve) (2009)
 Gwangneung Forest (Korea National Arboretum) (2010)
 Gochang (2013)
Suncheon (2018)
Gangwon Eco-peace (Korean Demilitarized Zone-near areas across five counties of Gangwon Province) (2019)
Yeoncheon Imjin River (2020)

Sri Lanka
 Hurulu (1977)
 Sinharaja (1978)
 Kanneliya-Dediyagala-Nakiyadeniya (KDN) (2004)
 Bundala (2005)

Thailand
 Sakaerat (1976)
 Hauy Tak Teak (1977)
 Mae Sa-Kog Ma (1977)
 Ranong (1997)
 Doi Luang Chiang Dao (2021)

Turkmenistan
 Repetek (1978)

Uzbekistan
 Mount Chatkal (1978)

Vietnam
 Cần Giờ Mangrove Forest (2000)
 Cát Tiên National Park (2001)
 Cát Bà Island (2004)
 Red River Delta (2004)
 Kien Giang (2006)
 Western Nghệ An (2007)
 Cape Cà Mau National Park (2009)
 Chàm Islands – Hội An (2009)
 Langbiang (2015)
 Núi Chúa National Park (2021)
 Kon Hà Nừng Highlands (2021)

References

External links
 List of UNESCO World Network of Biosphere Reserves in Asia and the Pacific
 List of UNESCO World Network of Biosphere Reserves of Asia and the Pacific
 UNESCO World Network of Biosphere Reserves

+